The papal conclave held from 14 to 16 October 1978 was triggered by the death of John Paul I on 28 September 1978, just 33 days after he was elected pope. The conclave to elect John Paul I's successor ended after eight ballots. The cardinal electors selected Cardinal Karol Józef Wojtyła, Archbishop of Kraków, as the new pope. The third pope in the year, Wojtyła accepted his election and took the name John Paul II.

Papabili and proceedings

Ten days after the funeral of Pope John Paul I, on 14 October, the doors of the Sistine Chapel were sealed and the conclave commenced. It was divided between two particularly strong candidates for the papacy: Cardinal Giuseppe Siri, the conservative archbishop of Genoa, and Cardinal Giovanni Benelli, the liberal archbishop of Florence and a close associate of John Paul I.

Inside the conclave were three non-cardinals. One was Donald Wuerl who, as secretary to the frail Cardinal John Wright, was allowed inside the Sistine Chapel to assist him.

This conclave had the same number of cardinals as the first conclave of 1978.  Only Albino Luciani himself (who became Pope John Paul I) was absent from this conclave after having attended the first conclave of 1978, and numerically this was offset by the presence of Cardinal Wright at this conclave.

Supporters of Benelli were confident that he would be elected. In early ballots, Benelli came within nine votes. But the scale of opposition to both papabili meant that neither was likely to receive the two-thirds majority for election. Among the Italian contingent, Cardinal Giovanni Colombo, the Archbishop of Milan, was the only viable compromise candidate, but when he started to receive votes, he announced that if elected he would decline the papacy. Cardinal Franz König, the influential and widely respected archbishop of Vienna, individually suggested to his fellow electors a compromise candidate: the Polish Cardinal Karol Józef Wojtyła, whom König knew and by whom he was highly impressed.

Also among those cardinals who rallied behind Wojtyła were supporters of Siri, Stefan Wyszyński, most of the American cardinals (led by John Krol), and other moderate cardinals. Wojtyła ultimately defeated Benelli (who was supposedly the candidate Wojtyła himself had voted for) on the eighth ballot on the third day with, according to the Italian press, 99 votes from the 111 participating electors. He accepted his election with these words: "With obedience in faith to Christ, my Lord, and with trust in the Mother of Christ and the Church, in spite of great difficulties, I accept." The pope, in tribute to his immediate predecessor, then took the name of John Paul II. He became the first non-Italian pope since the Dutch Adrian VI, who reigned from 1522 to 1523.

At 6:18 p.m. local time (17:18 UTC), the white smoke rose from the chimney of the Sistine Chapel, announcing to the public that a new pope had been elected. The senior cardinal deacon, Pericle Felici, after quickly checking the correct pronunciation of the new pope's Polish name with Cardinal Stefan Wyszyński, gave the traditional Latin announcement of Wojtyła's election from the balcony of St. Peter's Basilica.

John Paul II appeared on the balcony at 7:15, and while gripping the balustrade, delivered a brief speech before his first Urbi et Orbi blessing in Italian:

See also
Cardinal electors for the 1978 papal conclaves

References

External links
 A "Foreign" Pope from Time Magazine, 30 October 1978. (Subscription required.)
 "Exhilarating Roman Experiences of Prof. George Menachery", an Indian journalist's memoir of the conclave

1978 in Vatican City
1978 elections in Europe
1978 10
Pope John Paul II
20th-century Catholicism
1978 in Christianity
October 1978 events in Europe
Political history of Vatican City